Eopharingia is an excavata group.

References

Metamonads